is the tenth single by Do As Infinity, released on June 27, 2001. It is the band's best selling single in Japan. The song is used as the second ending theme for the anime Inuyasha. The accompanying music video for "Fukai Mori" was filmed in early 2001 at the Glücks Königreich theme park in Hokkaido, Japan.

This song was included in the band's compilation albums Do the Best and Do the A-side.

The song was later covered by Eir Aoi in her single Tsubasa.

Track listing
 
 
  (Instrumental)
  (Instrumental)

Charts and certifications

Weekly charts

Certifications and sales

References

External links
 "Fukai Mori" at Avex Network
 "Fukai Mori" at Oricon
 

2001 singles
2001 songs
Do As Infinity songs
Avex Trax singles
Inuyasha songs
Song recordings produced by Seiji Kameda
Songs written by Dai Nagao